This is a list of films which have placed number one at the weekend box office in Japan during 2011.

 Note: Click on the relevant weekend to view specifics.

Highest-grossing films

See also
List of Japanese films of 2011

References

2011
Japan
2011 in Japanese cinema